Charles Jackson French  (September 25, 1919 – November 7, 1956) was a United States Navy sailor. He had first enlisted in the Navy in 1937 and had completed his enlistment, moving to Omaha, Nebraska where he had family. With the attack on Pearl Harbor, French went to the closest recruitment office, and on December 19, 1941, re-enlisted in the United States Navy.

Biography
French was an orphan from Foreman, Arkansas who learned to swim in the Red River at the age of eight.

During World War II, messmate French swam 6–8 hours in shark-infested waters near Guadalcanal while towing a life raft with 15  survivors of an attack by the Japanese Imperial Navy. For this action, French received a letter of commendation from Adm. William F. Halsey Jr. in May 1943. Adm. Halsey was then commander of the Southern Pacific Fleet. The commendation stated:
For meritorious conduct in action while serving on board of a destroyer transport which was badly damaged during the engagement with Japanese forces in the British Solomon Islands on September 5, 1942. After the engagement, a group of about fifteen men was adrift on a raft, which was being deliberately shelled by Japanese naval forces. French tied a line to himself and swam for more than two hours without rest, thus attempting to tow the raft. His conduct was in keeping with the highest traditions of the Naval Service.French was memorialized on War Gum trading cards and in a comic strip. The Chicago Defender named him Hero of the Year.

French was posthumously awarded the Navy and Marine Corps Medal for his heroic actions. The award was presented on May 21, 2022, at Naval Base San Diego, at a ceremony in which the base's rescue swimmer training pool was dedicated in French's honor. 

In June 2022, President Biden signed into law (H.R.4168) to designate the facility of the United States Postal Service located at 6223 Maple Street, in Omaha, Nebraska, as the Petty Officer 1st Class Charles Jackson French Post Office.

French is buried at Fort Rosecrans National Cemetery  in San Diego, California.

References

1919 births
1956 deaths
United States Navy personnel of World War II
United States Navy sailors
Military personnel from Omaha, Nebraska
African-American United States Navy personnel
Burials at Fort Rosecrans National Cemetery
People from Little River County, Arkansas
African Americans in World War II
Military personnel from Arkansas